In the Czech Republic, Slovakia, and some parts of Hungary, the Easter Whip is used as part of a tradition of spanking or whipping on Easter Monday. 

In the morning, men gently spank women with a special handmade whip or switch called pomlázka or karabáč (in Czech) or korbáč (in Slovak) or siba or korbács (in Hungarian). The pomlázka consists of four to twenty-four withies (willow rods or other twigs), is usually from half a meter to two meters long and decorated with coloured ribbons at the end.

Women wear multiple long dresses to avoid the minor pain that would be caused by the whipping.
If men arrive at women's houses after 12 o'clock, women throw a bucket of cold water on them.  
In some regions the men also douse girls with water or spray perfume on them. 

When going house to house, the male first sings a verse relating to eggs and spring themes like bountifulness and fertility. If the young woman doesn't have any decorated eggs she turns around and the man takes a few whacks at her legs with the whip. The spanking may be painful, but is not intended to cause suffering. In cities, it's usually practised only among family members. 

In the past, young boys would chase young girls on the village streets with the whips, and vintage illustrations of people in traditional dress show girls running or hiding. Playful running around, similar to the game of tag, still occurs, but aggressive ambushing is now considered unacceptable bullying by the modern generation.

Tradition says that women should be spanked with a whip in order to keep their health, beauty and fertility throughout the following year.

According to 2019 survey, 60% of Czech households follow the tradition of spanking (or watering) someone on  Easter Monday.

In Croatia, it's made of olive twigs, but it isn't used for whipping. In some countries, such as Poland, Easter palms or pussy willows are used.

Etymology 

"Wicker whip": Czech karabáč, Slovak korbáč (the standard name for "whip" is bič and korbáč, itself originating from Turkish kırbaç, usually means only 1 particular type of it—the "wicker whip") – Hungarian korbács.

In the Czech Republic, such a switch is called pomlázka meaning "rejuvenator", implying that a female struck by a pomlázka will become younger and prettier.

See also 
Śmigus-dyngus

References

Czech folklore
Easter traditions
Whips
Slavic Easter traditions
Czech traditions
Slovak traditions